
Hot work is a process that can be a source of ignition when flammable material is present or can be a fire hazard regardless of the presence of flammable material in the workplace. Common hot work processes involve welding, soldering, cutting, brazing burning and the use of powder-actuated tools or similar fire producing operations outside of designated hot work areas. When flammable materials are not present, industrial processes such as grinding and drilling become cold work processes.

In some countries, such as the UK and Canada, a hot work permit is required for hot work. The purpose of a hot work permit is to effect "the employer's written authorization to perform hot working operations". The UK's Health and Safety Executive suggests that a hot work permit should specify:
what work will be done;
how and when it is to be done;
what safety and health precautions are needed;
who is responsible for checking it is safe for the work to start;
who will check that the work is done safely;
who is responsible for confirming that work is complete and there is no longer a risk from, or to, the people doing the work.

Safety 
When performing hot work, welders must assess the risk of fire in the work area and implement certain safety precautions if a threat is detected. The establishment of a fire watch is the most important precaution a welder can take against an accidental fire on a job site. Either the welder himself or an appointed laborer must become designated for a fire watch and stay in the area of the hot work for no less than 2 hours after the last of the hot work has been completed. This designated fire watch person must have a fire extinguisher and access to phone in case of a fire.

Standards
In the United States, OSHA maintains regulations for hot work in the marine industrial setting. The following regulations apply:
Hot Work. - 1915.14
Welding, cutting and heating (hot work). - 1917.152
Precautions for hot work. - 1915.503

Other relevant literature is:
 API RP 2009 : Safe Welding, Cutting, and Hot Work Practices in the Petroleum and Petrochemical Industries, published by the American Petroleum Institute (API).

See also
 Oil Industry Safety Directorate

References

External links
 *Hot Work / Welding - OSHA

Welding safety
Occupational safety and health
Fire protection